In enzymology, an oxamate carbamoyltransferase is an enzyme that catalyzes the chemical reaction

carbamoyl phosphate + oxamate  phosphate + oxalureate

Thus, the two substrates of this enzyme are carbamoyl phosphate and oxamate, whereas its two products are phosphate and oxalureate.

This enzyme belongs to the family of transferases that transfer one-carbon groups, specifically the carboxy- and carbamoyltransferases. The systematic name of this enzyme class is carbamoyl-phosphate:oxamate carbamoyltransferase. This enzyme is also called oxamic transcarbamylase. This enzyme participates in purine metabolism.

References

 

EC 2.1.3
Enzymes of unknown structure